People  occasionally use In-line skates, skateboards or other similar devices to tour around cities such as London and Paris. Such events are normally organized by a group of volunteers that operate in cooperation with the police and other local authorities, and would always use marshals to help control the traffic (see .)

The term suicide skate evolved to describe events where a group of around 5-30 people use In-line skates to tour around a city without informing the police or other local authorities and without using marshals to help control the traffic.

The term suicide skate probably evolved because in many cases, the participants would push themselves beyond their normal comfort zone, perhaps skating faster or using narrower or more crowded roads than they would normally be happy to use. In the case of relatively inexperienced skaters, simply skating on roads without the help of marshals to control traffic could be a significant step outside their personal comfort zone. Observers might regard such behavior as suicidal. However, participants would not,  running the gauntlet with taxis and buses is all considered part of the fun.

In some suicide skates, participants that could not keep pace with the others would simply be left behind. However, in other cases, the leading group of skaters would be happy to occasionally stop and wait for slower participants to catch up, thus ensuring that nobody was left behind.

Many gumbie skaters refer to anytime they are skating alone as "doing a suicide skate" which is an inappropriate use of the term.

References 

Roller skating